Nekrasovka is a station on the Nekrasovskaya line of the Moscow Metro. It was opened on 3 June 2019 as the eastern terminus of the inaugural stretch of the line, between Kosino and Nekrasovka.

Name
The station is named for Nekrasovka District, previously the settlement of Nekrasovka, east of Moscow.

Gallery

References

Moscow Metro stations
Railway stations in Russia opened in 2019
Nekrasovskaya line